Yang Huizhen (Chinese: 杨会珍; born 13 August 1992) is a Chinese sprinter specialising in the 400 metres. She won the gold at the 2015 Asian Championships and bronze at the 2015 Summer Universiade.

She studied physical education at the Beijing Sport University.

Competition record

Personal bests
Outdoor
200 metres – 24.03 (+0.5 m/s) (Taiyuan 2015)
400 metres – 51.98 (Gwangju 2015)
800 metres – 2:11.68 (Kunshan 2014)
Indoor
200 metres – 24.27 (Beijing 2015)
400 metres – 54.23 (Beijing 2014)

References

1992 births
Living people
Chinese female sprinters
Athletes (track and field) at the 2016 Summer Olympics
Olympic athletes of China
Universiade medalists in athletics (track and field)
Universiade bronze medalists for China
Medalists at the 2015 Summer Universiade
21st-century Chinese women